National Comics Publications, Inc. (also known as NCP or simply National) was an American comic book publishing company, and the direct predecessor of modern-day DC Comics.

History

The corporation was originally two companies: National Allied Publications, Inc. (also known as National Allied Newspaper Syndicate, Inc.) which was founded by Major Malcolm Wheeler-Nicholson in autumn 1934 to publish New Fun, the first American comic book with all-original material rather than comic strip reprints, and Detective Comics, Inc., formed in 1937 with Wheeler-Nicholson and Jack S. Liebowitz listed as owners. Wheeler-Nicholson remained for a year before being forced out in 1938, and Detective Comics, Inc. purchased the remains of National Allied Publications.

National Allied and Detective Comics, Inc. merged to become National Comics Publications, Inc. on September 30, 1946, absorbing Max Gaines' and Liebowitz's All-American Publications as well. National Comics was renamed National Periodical Publications, Inc. in 1961.

Despite the official names "National Comics" and "National Periodical Publications", the company began branding itself as "Superman-DC" as early as the 1950s, and it became known colloquially as DC Comics for years before the official adoption of that name in 1977.

See also
 National Comics Publications, Inc. v. Fawcett Publications, Inc.

Notes

References

Further reading
 Charles Wooley (1986). Wooley's History of the Comic Book, 1899-1936: The Origin of the Superhero. Lake Buena Vista, Florida. 1986.

DC Comics
Comic book publishing companies of the United States
Defunct comics and manga publishing companies
Publishing companies disestablished in 1977
Publishing companies established in 1934
Publishing companies established in 1937
Publishing companies established in 1946
American companies established in 1934
American companies established in 1937
American companies established in 1946
American companies disestablished in 1977